Akula Sree Ramulu College of Engineering (ASRCE) is a private engineering college established by ASR Educational Society in Tanuku, West Godavari district, Andhra Pradesh, India. It is located on the National Highway (NH-16),  from Tanuku railway station. The college is affiliated to Jawaharlal Nehru Technological University, Kakinada, and is approved by the All India Council for Technical Education.

History 
The founder Chairman of ASR Group of Educational Institutions, Late Sri. Akula Sree Ramulu started this educational world with schools and gradually he extended many courses like Industrial Training (I.T.I), Polytechnic (Diploma), Degree, P.G, D.Ed., B.Ed., MCA, MBA, B.Tech. and M.Tech.

Courses Offered 
 B.Tech Computer Science and Engineering
 B.Tech Electronics and Communication Engineering
 B.Tech Information Technology
 B.Tech Electrical and Electronics Engineering
 B.Tech Mechanical Engineering
 M.Tech Computer Science and Engineering
 M.Tech Electronics and Communication Engineering
 M.Tech Structural Engineering
 M.Tech CAD CAM
 M.Tech Thermal Engineering

References

Engineering colleges in Andhra Pradesh
Universities and colleges in West Godavari district
1998 establishments in Andhra Pradesh
Educational institutions established in 1998